Antiplanes delicatus is a species of sea snail, a marine gastropod mollusk in the family Pseudomelatomidae.

Description

Distribution

References

 Okutani, T. & Iwahori, A., 1992. Noteworthy gastropods collected from Bathyal Zone in Tosa Bay by the R/V Kotaku-Maru in 1987 and 1988. Venus 51(4):235–268

External links

Pseudomelatomidae
Gastropods described in 1992